Kim Wan-sik (born 29 July 1971) is a South Korean volleyball player. He competed in the men's tournament at the 1992 Summer Olympics.

References

External links
 

1971 births
Living people
South Korean men's volleyball players
Olympic volleyball players of South Korea
Volleyball players at the 1992 Summer Olympics
Place of birth missing (living people)
20th-century South Korean people